Sergey Vyacheslavovich Lazarev (born 1 April 1983) is a Russian singer, dancer and actor. He is most famous for his singing career, when he rose to fame as a member of the group Smash!!. The group broke up in 2006. Since then Lazarev has pursued a solo career. He represented Russia in the Eurovision Song Contest 2016 in Stockholm, Sweden, and finished in third place, coming first in the televote. He represented Russia again at Eurovision Song Contest 2019 in Tel Aviv, Israel with the song "Scream", and similarly finished in third place. In January 2023, Ukraine imposed sanctions on Lazarev for his support of 2022 Russian invasion of Ukraine.

Early life and child stardom 
Lazarev was born in Moscow on 1 April 1983. From age of four, Lazarev practiced artistic gymnastics, but stopped due to his parents' divorce. Subsequently, Lazarev started singing in a children's choir and became interested in performing.

Lazarev got to know about Neposedy's existence merely by accident. A shopkeeper recommended Lazarev to apply for Neposedy while Lazarev was buying bread. In 1995, he became part of the children's group alongside Lena Katina and Julia Volkova. With Neposedy he regularly performed at the Russian television show Morning Star and in 1996, he performed at a concert at the Slavianski Bazaar. In September 1996 Lazarev won the first prize at the contest Bravo Bravissimo in Italy. The same year he sang with the president orchestra led by Pavel B. Ovsyannikov.

Next to singing, Lazarev worked as a child actor. When he was eleven, he performed in the Pokrovsky Theatre and had parts in several plays. Lazarev also appeared in children's sketch comedy programme Yeralash in 1997

Acting 
In 2000, Lazarev entered Moscow's MKhAT Theatre School and graduated in 2004 as a professional actor. In 1999 he enrolled at Russia's leading dramatic institute, the school-studio MAAT, and graduated with honors in 2003. As a student, Lazarev played the main parts in Pushkin Theatre's productions of Romeo and Juliet, and Karamazov. For his role as Romeo, he was nominated for a "Seagull" dramatic debut award for the "Best Love Scene".

In 2005 he returned to the theatre scene. His part in the 2005 Broadway-style musical comedy Lend Me A Tenor brought him five professional theater awards, making the play the biggest success of the 2005 theatre season.

In Smash!! 

Lazarev's music career blossomed when he became part of Smash!! (in Russian СМЭШ!!), a Russian pop duo formed in 2000 by Lazarev and fellow former Neposedy singer Vlad Topalov. At the beginning of 2002 the duo shot their first music video for the song "Should Have Loved You More". That August, Smash!! won the New Wave contest in Jūrmala and in October 2002 Smash!! released their first single "Belle". The video for "Belle" topped MTV Russia's chart for 6 months and entered the list of top 20 clips of the past five years. The story behind this song tells about the formation of the duo Smash!!, apparently Topalov and Lazarev rehearsed the song as a birthday present to Topalov's father, but after he heard the song he immediately told all his friends and ended up on the radio as one of his friends started playing at a local station.

In February 2003 the band finally released their debut album, Freeway. Over a million discs were sold in Russia and other nations in the Commonwealth of Independent States. Smash!! subsequently toured Russia throughout 2003.

The following year Freeway was released in East Asian countries including; Korea, China, Taiwan, Thailand, Hong Kong, Malaysia, Singapore, Indonesia, India, and the Philippines. The release of the album was followed by the promotional tour in the South-Eastern Asia, during which the band shot a video clip for the cover-version of George Michael's song "Faith" in Shanghai.

In May 2004 Smash!! in cooperation with the Italian band Earphones recorded the song "Obsession". When the song entered the radio rotation, it immediately gained the top of hit parades and became the top summer hit 2004. That year Smash!! received the award of the MTV Russian Music Awards (RMA in short) 2004 as the pop-project of the year, and the award of the sound-track as the band of the year.

On 1 December 2004 Smash!! released the second album, 2Nite. The band split up only one week after the release, with both Lazarev and Topalov deciding to pursue solo careers.

Solo career 
Together with British producer Brian Rawling, Lazarev recorded most of the songs for his solo debut Don't Be Fake that was released in November 2005 and sold more than 300,000 copies in Russia alone. In May 2006 Lazarev received Russia's national Music TV Channel's MUZ TV award as Best New Act. The fourth single from the album "Fake" was released to clubs in the UK, debuting on 30 July at #28 on the commercial club chart in Music Week.

Don't be Fake'''s first two singles, "Eye of the Storm" and "Lost Without Your Love", were soon released. The video clips of these singles were shot in Miami and South Africa, respectively. The third single "Daje Esli Ty Uydiosh (Даже Если Ты Уйдёшь)" ("Just Because You Walk Away" in English) became the biggest single from the album, peaking at #1 for many weeks, remaining on the charts for over six months, coming back to the charts twice more, and eventually reaching #2 in the annual airplay chart of most played songs in 2006. Due to the massive popularity of the song, the album was re-issued with bonus tracks including 3 versions of the song—the English version (which can be found on the first issue), the Russian version, and a dance remix also sung in Russian. Lazarev also performed the song at the MTV Russia Awards. The single was written by American songwriter Gordon Pogoda and Australian writer/artist John Stephan. The fourth single, "Fake", was plugged and the video clip was shot in London. Meanwhile, the Fake Remixes EP was published. This was also promoted to some clubs in the United Kingdom.

After the success of his first album, Lazarev went to the studio and recorded a new album TV Show The video for the lead single, "Vspominay (Вспоминай)" was shot in Moscow. The English version of the song, "Everytime", was soon released along with the video clip, this one being similar to the Russian version. Lazarev recorded a cover of "Shattered Dreams", originally sung by Johnny Hates Jazz. This was the second single of the album and the first international single for Lazarev. The video was said to be shot in Canada.

The same year, Lazarev won the Best Male Singer award in RMA 2006, defeating Dima Bilan. During the ceremony, Topalov and Lazarev got together and sang "Belle" for the first time in years, ending the performance with a hug from the two former best friends. TV show was released in Europe in 2007. This was a theme-album talking about TV shows and reality by mostly love ballads. "Shattered Dreams" was on this album together with 11 other tracks, including "TV or Radio" his third single and "Girlfriend" his fourth single of this album. His single "Shattered Dreams" was eventually released in the United Kingdom as well.

In 2008, he was a candidate to represent Russia in the Eurovision Song Contest 2008 with the song "the Flyer". He finished fourth in Russia's national final, which was won by Dima Bilan. As his international fame rose, he performed to full-capacity crowds at The Opera House in Bournemouth, England on 23 March 2008 as a supporting act to British dance group Booty Luv. Also in 2008, Lazarev won MTV's Artist of the Year Award. Consequently, releasing the video of the Russian version of the song "Almost Sorry", ("Зачем придумали любовь") this one being the fifth and last single of the album. Songwriters of the Russian version were Chris Landon, Taryn Murphy and Lara D'elia.

In 2009 Lazarev collaborated with artist Timati and made a video of the song "Lazerboy". In April 2009 Lazarev promoted "Stereo", the lead single for his third solo album and sang "Already Know" and "Out of Control". All four songs were expected to appear on his upcoming album, but only "Lazerboy" made the cut.

On 31 March 2010 Electric Touch was released in Russian music stores. The video for "Alarm" was released on 10 May and on 26 June it was confirmed the song "Feeling High" was the new single from Electric Touch.

In 2012, Lazarev released another English-language song, "Take It Off".

On 10 December 2015, it was announced that Lazarev would represent Russia at the Eurovision Song Contest 2016 in Stockholm. In the final, he reached third place with his song "You Are the Only One", Lazarev won the televote with 361 points, and came fifth with the national jury scoring 130 points. It was rumoured that in the 2017 contest, which Russia ultimately withdrew from, Lazarev was originally intended to be Russia's spokesperson during the jury voting sequence.

On February 7, Lazarev announced that he would represent Russia in the Eurovision Song Contest 2019 in Tel Aviv, Israel with the song "Scream". He again finished third in the final, with 370 points.

 Other appearances 
In 2006 Lazarev finished second in the Russian version of Dancing on Ice.

In 2008 he placed first in the reality show Circus of the Stars.

In 2021 he placed first in the competition show Tantsy so zvyozdami (Tанцы со звёздами), the Russian version of Dancing with the Stars''.

Political views 
In 2014, following the Annexation of Crimea by the Russian Federation and during his stay in Ukraine, Lazarev stated to Ukrainian television, "Maybe my own Russian fans will throw tomatoes at me, but this is the way it is for me. When I travel to Yalta, for me it's Ukraine." However, in his later comments on Ukrainian television the singer said that his words had been taken out of context. Lazarev explained that in fact he meant that the territorial change was so instant that he could not get used to the idea that Crimea was part of Russia again and "need[ed] time to realize it"; the singer compared it to the feeling of those who remember the transfer of Crimea from Russia to Ukraine in 1954: "I perfectly understand those who, in 1954, suddenly woke up in Ukraine, and who wanted Crimea to return to Russia. I know, many are happy with that. But I need time to realize that". Lazarev claimed the recording of his speech was shortened and edited by the Ukrainian TV crew for use in an "anti-Russian" an information war.

In January 2023 Ukraine imposed sanctions on Sergey Lazarev for promoting Russia during the 2022 Russian invasion of Ukraine.

Personal life 
In December 2016, he announced that he has a two-year-old son, Nikita, after pictures of both attending church were captured by paparazzi. Nikita was later featured in Lazarev's music video for "Так красиво" in 2017. In September 2019, during an interview with Lera Kudryavtseva, Sergey disclosed having a one-year-old daughter, Anya, with the same biological mother as Nikita but born from a different surrogate mother. This was also the first confirmation of Nikita having been born via surrogate.

Discography

Studio albums

Extended plays

Compilation albums

Live albums

Remix albums

Singles

Tours
 Don't Be Fake Tour 
 TV Show Tour 
 Lazerboy Live 
 Heartbeat Tour 
 Lazarev Live 
 The Best Tour 
 N Tour 
 Я не боюсь! Live

References

External links 

  

1983 births
English-language singers from Russia
Eurovision Song Contest entrants of 2016
Eurovision Song Contest entrants of 2019
Living people
Musicians from Moscow
Eurovision Song Contest entrants for Russia
Russian nationalists
Nationalist musicians
Anti-Ukrainian sentiment in Russia
Russian pop singers
Russian child singers
21st-century Russian male singers
21st-century Russian singers
Russian National Music Award winners
Moscow Art Theatre School alumni
Winners of the Golden Gramophone Award